Jeff Chandler (born 12 March 1966) is  a former Australian rules footballer who played with North Melbourne in the Victorian Football League (VFL).

Notes

External links 		
		
		
		
		
		
		
Living people		
1966 births		
		
Australian rules footballers from Victoria (Australia)		
North Melbourne Football Club players
Strathmore Football Club players